The 2016 Pacific Challenge was the eleventh World Rugby Pacific Challenge. Four teams featured in the tournament which was hosted in Fiji. The tournament was won by Fiji Warriors, who defeated  by 36–0 in the final.

Format
The teams played against each other initially in a round-robin competition, after which the top two sides played off in a final and the bottom two sides played off for third place. The 2016 Pacific Challenge was also a testing ground for the new points system that World Rugby was trialling, where tries were valued at six points instead of five and penalty goals and drop goals were valued at two points instead of three.

Teams
The four teams competing:

 
 Fiji Warriors

Table

Match results

Round 1

Round 2

Round 3

Finals

References

World Rugby Pacific Challenge
Pacific Challenge
2016 in Fijian rugby union
2016 in Samoan rugby union
2016 in Tongan rugby union
2015–16 in Japanese rugby union
Pacific
International rugby union competitions hosted by Fiji
World Rugby Pacific Challenge